Azamgarh Lok Sabha constituency is one of the 80 Lok Sabha (parliamentary) constituencies in Uttar Pradesh state in northern India.

Vidhan Sabha segments
Presently, Azamgarh Lok Sabha constituency comprises five Vidhan Sabha (legislative assembly) segments. These are:

Members of Lok Sabha

^ by-poll

Results

Bye-election 2022

General election 2019

General election 2014

General election 2009

See also
 Azamgarh district
 List of Constituencies of the Lok Sabha

External links
Azamgarh lok sabha  constituency election 2019 result details
 Azamgarh Lok Sabha Results from 1971 to 2014

References

Lok Sabha constituencies in Uttar Pradesh
Politics of Azamgarh district